The Edson Hotel in Beaumont, Texas was built in 1929 at a cost of $1.5 Million, and was designed by F.W. and D.E. Steinman of Beaumont. The building is 22 stories tall.  The building was bought in 1955 by Gulf States Utilities, and has been an office building ever since.

See also

National Register of Historic Places listings in Jefferson County, Texas

References

External links

Buildings and structures in Beaumont, Texas
Hotel buildings completed in 1929
Neoclassical architecture in Texas
Hotel buildings on the National Register of Historic Places in Texas
Historic district contributing properties in Texas
National Register of Historic Places in Jefferson County, Texas